Jula Kamar (also Romanized as Jūlā Kamar, Chūlā Kamar, Jilu Kamar, and Jūlākamar) is a village in Beyranvand-e Shomali Rural District, Bayravand District, Khorramabad County, Lorestan Province, Iran. At the 2006 census, its population was 73, in 19 families.

References 

Towns and villages in Khorramabad County